Mohannad Ibrahim Ali Ibrahim (born 1 February 1986), commonly known as Mohannad Ibrahim, is a Syrian footballer.

Club career

Syria
Mohannad began his professional career with his parent club Al-Karamah SC, based in his home town Homs, in 2003. During his nine-years spell in Syria with Al-Karamah SC, he helped them to win 4 Syrian Premier League titles in 2005-06, 2006–07, 2007–08 and 2008–09 and also helped them to secure the 2nd position in the 2009–10 Syrian Premier League. He also helped them to win 4 Syrian Cup titles in 2007, 2008, 2009 and 2010, Syrian Super Cup in 2009. Two of his biggest achievements with the Homs-based club were to reach the finals of the 2006 AFC Champions League and also the finals of the 2009 AFC Cup at the continental level.

Saudi Arabia
In January 2009, he moved on-loan on a five-months contract to Saudi Arabian club Al-Ettifaq FC of the Saudi Professional League. He made 8 appearances in the 2009–10 Saudi Professional League for the Dammam-based club.

Jordan
In 2011, he signed a one-year contract with Jordanian club Kufrsoum SC. He scored 7 league goals in 15 appearances for the Irbid-based club. Later in 2012, he signed a six-months contract with Jordanian top club Al-Wehdat SC. He scored 5 league goals in 11 appearances for the Amman New Camp-based club.

Iraq
After a one and a half-year spell in Jordan, he moved to the neighboring country Iraq where he signed a six-months contract with Al-Sinaa SC. He made 6 league appearances for the Baghdad-based club.

Bahrain
Later in 2013, he moved to Bahrain where he signed a six-months contract with Al-Ahli Club.

Oman
On 17 August 2014, he moved to Oman and signed a one-year contract with Al-Seeb Club. He made his Oman Professional League debut and scored his first goal on 11 September 2014 in a 2-1 loss against Sur SC.

Club career statistics

International career
Ibrahim was a part of the Syrian U-23 team in the 2008 AFC Olympic Qualifiers. He also played for the Syrian U-23 team in the 2008 WAFF Championship in Iran.

Honours

Club
With Al-Karamah
Syrian Premier League (4): 2005-06, 2006–07, 2007–08, 2008–09; Runner-up 2009–10
Syrian Cup (4): 2007, 2008, 2009, 2010
Syrian Super Cup (1): 2009
AFC Champions League (0): Runner-up 2006
AFC Cup (0): Runner-up 2009

References

External links

Mohanad Al Ibrahim at Goal.com

1986 births
Living people
Sportspeople from Homs
Syrian Muslims
Syrian footballers
Syria international footballers
Syrian expatriate footballers
Association football forwards
Al-Karamah players
Ettifaq FC players
Al-Wehdat SC players
Al-Seeb Club players
Saudi Professional League players
Oman Professional League players
Expatriate footballers in Saudi Arabia
Syrian expatriate sportspeople in Saudi Arabia
Expatriate footballers in Jordan
Syrian expatriate sportspeople in Jordan
Expatriate footballers in Iraq
Syrian expatriate sportspeople in Iraq
Expatriate footballers in Bahrain
Syrian expatriate sportspeople in Bahrain
Expatriate footballers in Oman
Syrian expatriate sportspeople in Oman
Syrian Premier League players